Abdelkader El Brazi (
5 November 1964 – 24 January 2014) was a Moroccan football goalkeeper.

He started his career as a goalkeeper with his hometown's team Renaissance de Berkane, and played also for FAR Rabat and Ismaily SC.

He played for the Morocco national football team (36 matches) and was a participant at the 1998 FIFA World Cup.

He died on 24 January 2014 after suffering from cancer for several years.

References

External links

1964 births
2014 deaths
Moroccan footballers
Moroccan expatriate footballers
Morocco international footballers
1998 FIFA World Cup players
1992 African Cup of Nations players
1998 African Cup of Nations players
Botola players
AS FAR (football) players
Ismaily SC players
Expatriate footballers in Egypt
Moroccan expatriate sportspeople in Egypt
Association football goalkeepers
People from Berkane
Deaths from cancer in Morocco
RS Berkane players
Egyptian Premier League players